Tarun Bhanot (born 15 December 1971) is an Indian politician who is the former Finance Minister of Madhya Pradesh. He is a member of the Indian National Congress. Bhanot became a member of the Madhya Pradesh Legislative Assembly in 2013 from the constituency of Jabalpur West and was re-elected in 2018. He resigned as Finance Minister after Chief Minister Kamal Nath's government lost its majority in the Legislative Assembly, which resulted in the collapse of the Nath Government.

References

See also

Madhya Pradesh Legislative Assembly
2013 Madhya Pradesh Legislative Assembly election
2008 Madhya Pradesh Legislative Assembly election

1971 births
Indian National Congress politicians from Madhya Pradesh
Living people
Punjabi people
Punjabi Hindus